Paul Shelly was an Irish sportsperson.  He played hurling with his local club Killenaule and with the Tipperary senior inter-county team in the late 1990s.

Shelly played for Tipperary as a defender and also as a full forward later in his career. In 1997 he was named in the Hurling All Star team in the right corner back position.
He was a member of the Tipperary team the lost both the Munster Final and All Ireland Final to Clare in 1997.

References

Living people
Tipperary inter-county hurlers
Killenaule hurlers
Year of birth missing (living people)